Brian Mason (born September 5, 1950) is a Canadian retired ice hockey coach who led R.I.T to their first national championship in 1983.

Career
Brian Mason debuted in college hockey in 1970 with the powerhouse Clarkson Golden Knights led by legendary coach Len Ceglarski. Clarkson had finished up as the tournament runner-up the year before and despite a second-place finish in the 1971 tournament the Golden Knights were passed over in favor of regular season champion Boston University. While Mason would lead the team in scoring for the next two seasons Clarkson was unable to get close to another tournament berth during his time there. Mason went on to a brief professional career with the IHL's Dayton Gems before hanging up his skates in 1975–76 season.

By 1978 Mason was back in college, this time behind the bench at Rensselaer as an assistant. After only two years he was given the opportunity to be a head coach at Division II R.I.T. In his four years there Mason's squads never had a losing season and won more games every season, growing from 14 in his first year to 29 in his last. He also brought RIT their first national title in 1982-83 and their first ECAC West tournament title the year after. On April 6, 1984 Dartmouth announced that Mason would be replacing George Crowe as head coach.

Mason was taking over a declining program in Hanover that had seen some success in previous years but the recent returns hadn't been good. His first two seasons with the Big Green saw modest improvements to 5- and 7-win seasons but a 2-22-1 mark in his third year was the worst the program had ever recorded. A significant jump to 10 wins the next year began to erode immediately thereafter and ended with only four victories in 1989-90, leading to Mason's dismissal from the team. In his six-year tenure the Big Green never had a winning season and missed the ECAC tournament every time. The only saving grace for Mason is that the year after he left his replacement Ben Smith beat Mason's record for the worst season in Dartmouth history with a 1-24-3 finish.

Career statistics

Head coaching record

References

External links

1950 births
Canadian ice hockey coaches
Dartmouth Big Green men's ice hockey coaches
RIT Tigers men's ice hockey coaches
Living people
Ice hockey people from Nova Scotia
Sportspeople from Halifax, Nova Scotia
Dayton Gems players